Flavia Tartaglini (born 2 February 1985) is an Italian sailor. She represented her country at the 2016 Summer Olympics.

She is first cousin of the Italian international rugby union players Andrea and Matteo Pratichetti and granddaughter of the former rugby union international Silvano Tartaglini.

References

External links
 
 
 

1985 births
Living people
Italian female sailors (sport)
Sailors at the 2016 Summer Olympics – RS:X
Olympic sailors of Italy
Universiade medalists in sailing
Mediterranean Games silver medalists for Italy
Competitors at the 2018 Mediterranean Games
Mediterranean Games medalists in sailing
Universiade silver medalists for Italy
Medalists at the 2005 Summer Universiade
21st-century Italian women
Italian windsurfers
Female windsurfers